Hada (Mongolian: ,; , born November 29, 1955) is an ethnic Mongol activist, who has campaigned for self-determination of Southern Mongolia (the Inner Mongolia Autonomous Region of China). He was detained for 15 years in prison in Chifeng. He was released from prison on December 10, 2010, but still detained in an detention centre in Inner Mongolia. In December 2014 he was released from detention.

Early life and education

Hada was born into a Mongolian family on November 29, 1955. In early 1981, while at university he joined the Inner Mongolian student movement, which was campaigning to preserve Mongolian identity in Inner Mongolia under Chinese law. Hada obtained his master's degree in philosophy in 1983, and published articles on political theory in Mongolian. He began research studies in the political theory department of Inner Mongolia Normal University in 1986. With his wife, Xinna, he opened a Mongolian studies bookstore in Hohhot, the capital of Inner Mongolia.

Political activities and arrest 

In the 1980s, Xi Haiming, Huchuntegus, Wang Manlai, and Hada; all students at universities in Hohhot, discussed establishment of the Inner Mongolian People's Party, a political party for Mongolians in Inner Mongolia.
In May 1992, Hada and other Mongol activists (including Tegexi) formed the Southern Mongolian Democratic Alliance (originally named as the Mongolian Culture Rescue Committee) and appointed Hada as chairman. In 1994 the alliance started a newspaper named the Voice of Southern Mongolia, and in 1995 they adopted a constitution outlining the Alliance's main mission as "opposing colonization by the Han people and striving for self-determination, freedom and democracy in Southern [Inner] Mongolia." The Voice of Southern Mongolia newspaper was declared illegal in 1995 and remains banned.

On December 10, 1995, Hada was arrested at his home by police from the Inner Mongolian Public Security Bureau. The police took all documents related to the Alliance, and names and addresses of more than 100 international scholar contacts of Hada. Hada was officially arrested on March 9, 1996.

Trial and sentencing 
On August 19, 1996, the Hohhot People's Procuratorate charged Hada with "espionage", "separatism", "stealing secrets for the enemy" and "organizing counterrevolutionary forces". On November 11, 1996, after a closed hearing, Hada was convicted on the charges of separatism and espionage by the Hohhot Intermediate People's Court, for which he received a combined sentence of 15 years in prison with a further 4 years deprivation of political rights. The Inner Mongolia Supreme People's Court rejected Hada's appeal. Tegexi was sentenced to 10-year prison and 3 years of deprivation of political rights for "separatism", but was released in December 2002, for "good behavior".

After Hada's arrest, at least 10 other Mongolian intellectuals were arrested. Hada's wife Xinna left a note on the door of her book store about Hada's detention and crackdown on activists. The authorities immediately suppressed a students protest that followed and arrested 12 of them. Xinna was taken into custody and investigated for "inciting students to cause a disturbance". Although not charged, Xinna was released 4 months later, on April 12, 1996. The Public Security Bureau closed the bookstore in Hohhot, even though the family had no other source of income.

In June 1998, Xinna wrote an open letter to Bill Clinton, who was visiting China as U.S. president. She described Hada's condition declaring his health problems were "not taken seriously by prison authorities". Xinna asked the authorities to transfer Hada to Hohhot prison for better care and medical treatment. The Chinese authorities never acceded to these requests.

In 2002, Uiles (or Ulies), the son of Hada was charged and sentenced to 2 years prison.,

In 2004, Human Rights in China reported that Hada had been subjected to torture.

In August 2007, Uiles was permitted to visit his father in Chifeng Prison. In a report he described the terrible condition of detention as well as the difficult health issues of his father. He has still been detained beyond his sentence term without any explanation.

Notes 
a.; 
b.
c.

External links
Campaign for the release of Hada (smhric.org)

References 

1955 births
Inner Mongolia
Hohhot
Chinese prisoners and detainees
Prisoners and detainees of the People's Republic of China
Living people
Inner Mongolian independence movement
Mongolian independence activists